Karma's A B*tch is a television series airing on Investigation Discovery. Hosted by Steve Schirripa, the show tells stories of victims seeking revenge against those who have wronged them, such as bullies, ex-lovers, criminals/con-artists, even businesses. Others such as Cassandra Bankson tell how they managed to get revenge by simply becoming successful in life.

References

2010s American reality television series
2013 American television series debuts
Investigation Discovery original programming
2014 American television series endings